Sergeyevka is a rural locality (a selo) and the administrative center of Sergeyevskoye Rural Settlement, Podgorensky District, Voronezh Oblast, Russia. The population was 1,096 as of 2010. There are 8 streets.

Geography 
Sergeyevka is located 15 km east of Podgorensky (the district's administrative centre) by road. Morozovka is the nearest rural locality.

References 

Rural localities in Podgorensky District